RITE Method, for Rapid Iterative Testing and Evaluation, typically referred to as "RITE" testing, is an iterative usability method.  It was defined by Michael Medlock, Dennis Wixon, Bill Fulton, Mark Terrano and Ramon Romero.  It has been publicly championed by Dennis Wixon while working in the games space for Microsoft. It has many similarities to "traditional" or "discount" usability testing.  The tester and team must define a target population for testing, schedule participants to come into the lab, decide on how the users' behaviors will be measured, construct a test script and have participants engage in a verbal protocol (e.g. think aloud). However it differs from these methods in that it advocates that changes to the user interface are made as soon as a problem is identified and a solution is clear.  Sometimes this can occur after observing as few as one participant. Once the data for a participant has been collected the usability engineer and team decide if they will be making any changes to the prototype prior to the next participant. The changed interface is then tested with the remaining users. The philosophy behind the RITE method is described as: "1) once you find a problem, solve it as soon as you can, and 2) make the decision makers part of the research team."  In this way it is a bridge between a strict research method and a design method...and in many ways it represents a participatory design method."As Researchers you get a lot of fundamental training on what constitutes actionable proof. That fundamental training focuses on 'completing your research' before drawing conclusions. In publishing RITE we wanted Researchers to acknowledge that in the correct circumstances you can make strong and accurate conclusions and 'complete research' quite quickly. Perhaps more importantly, the standard literature (of the time) on usability testing was indexed on accurate identification of problem areas. The key word in the RITE acronym is Iterative. Through iteration you can prove that something is fixed, which we felt was a more important way to think about research findings. Find a thing. That's nice. Find and fix it. Far better." — Ramon RomeroInitially it was documented as being used in the PC games business, but in all truth it has probably been in use "unofficially" since designers started prototyping products and watching users use the prototypes.  Since its official definition and naming its use has rapidly expanded to many other software industries, including interface design research.

References

See also 

 Usability testing
 Usability
 Human factors
 Human–computer interaction
 User-centered design
 Interaction design
 Software testing
 Acceptance testing

Usability